Murder in High Places is a 1991 American TV film written and directed by John Byrum.

It was originally a pilot for an NBC series to be called Out of Season.

Premise
A gonzo journalist like Hunter S. Thompson (Ted Levine) is elected mayor of a fictional Colorado town. He teams up with an ex-cop-pro football player (Adam Baldwin) to solve a murder case.

Cast
Ted Levine
Adam Baldwin
Lisa Kudrow

Reception
Newsday wrote "What an amazing show that was. An irreverent, funny, poignant and violent story about different counterculture people as well as the rich and famous. Different dialogue, different things happening in a show written for adults, by adults.... It really pushed the envelope for NBC. Unfortunately, once [Brandon] Tartikoff threw himself out the door at NBC for Paramount the envelope went with him. "Out of Season" (a.k.a. "Murder in High Places") wound up in the dead-letter file at the new, dull NBC."

References

External links
Murder in High Places at IMDb

1991 films
1991 television films
American television films
Films directed by John Byrum